The EOS 7s / 30V / ELAN 7NE (Japanese/Asia-Pacific European/North American product names) and the EOS 33V / ELAN 7N (Asia-Pacific Europe/North America) are 35 mm film single-lens reflex cameras from Canon of Japan, launched in April 2004.  The 7s/30V/ELAN 7NE employ Canon's Eye Controlled Focus mechanism while the 33V/ELAN 7N do not.  These cameras were the replacements for the earlier EOS 30/33 model.

Perhaps the most important upgrade
compared to the EOS 30/33 was the flash metering; this was the first film camera to support Canon's new E-TTL II flash metering system with compatible EX-series external flashes. The autofocus system received a mild upgrade from the earlier model and is equivalent to the system in the contemporaneous EOS 10D.
A minor but significant improvement was a backlight for the LCD on the upper panel, allowing the camera's settings to be viewed without a flashlight at night.  Other changes included raised letters and symbols on the camera's controls, and a changed external finish.

References

30V